This is a list of aircraft in alphabetical order beginning with 'G'.

G-Gn

G-Aerosports
 G-Aerosports Archon SF/1
 G-Aerosports Archon SF-2T
 G-Aerosports G-802 Atairon

G/B Aircraft 
(Glenn Beets) does not fly well

 Beets G/B Special

G1 Aviation
(Le Thor, France)
G1 Aviation G1

Gabardini
(Aeroplani Gabardini / Società Anonima Gabardini per l'Incremento dell'Aviazione)
also see:SIA
Gabardini Hydravion 1910 (Monaco-monoplano)
Gabardini Monoplano Gabarda 1913
Gabardini Monoplano Checca ('Francesca') Ground trainer
Gabardini Monoplano ground trainer
Gabardini Monoplano Scuola (School)
Gabardini Monoplano Vuolo (Flight)
Gabardini Idrovolante 1913 'Gabarda' on twin, wooden float gear
Gabardini HD  - Hanriot HD.1 used at the Scuola Aviazione di Cameri
Gabardini A.300/6 - 3-seat recce biplane, mod. Ansaldo A.300/4*
Gabardini G.3 1914 'Biplano' 1-/2-seat biplane trainer
Gabardini G.4
Gabardini G-4 bis: Single-seat vers. 1 x 120 hp Le Rhone
Gabardini G-4 bis dc: 'Doppio Comando' dual-control 2-seater
Gabardini G.5
Gabardini G.50 Single-seat biplane, a.k.a. (G.50 mc (monocomando))
Gabardini G.51: Single-seat biplane, 1 x 80 hp Le Rhône 9C rotary
Gabardini G.51 bis Single-seat biplane, 1 x 110 hp Le Rhône 9J 
Gabardini G.51 dc Doppio Comando
Gabardini G.6 2-seat biplane advanced trainer, 1 x 120 hp Le Rhone
Gabardini G.7 2-seat biplane trainer,
Gabardini G.8 trainer: unarmed, 1 x 140 hp Hispano-Suiza 8A V8 - Unarmed version with lower-rated engine
Gabardini G.8 fighter: 2 x 7.7mm Vickers mgs, 1 x 200 hp HS 8A V-8 
Gabardini G.8bis
Gabardini G.9
Gabardini G.9bis
Gabardini G.9bis
Gabardini Lictor 90 1 x 90 hp Fiat A.50S 7-cyl radial, x 1 (MM.345)
Gabardini Lictor 130 130 hp Alfa Romeo 110 4-cyl inline, x 1 (MM.304)

Gabriel
(Antoni Gabriel)
 Gabriel Śląsk

Gabriel
(Pavel & Jan Gabriel)
 Gabriel L7A
 Gabriel P 5
 Gabriel P 6
 Gabriel P 7

Gadfly 
 Gadfly HDW.1

GAF 
(Government Aircraft Factories)
 GAF Jindivik
 GAF Nomad
 GAF Pika

Gage 
(1911: Jay Gage Flying School, Griffith Park, Los Angeles, CA, c.1912: Gage-McClay Co.)
 Gage 1912 Biplane

Gail 
(Gail Aircraft Engineering Co, Sacramento, CA)
 Gail 202 Mantis
 Gail 202A Gold'uster

Gaines 
(Albert B Gaines, New York, NY)
 Gaines 1927 Monoplane

Gakkel
(Yakov Modestovich Gakkel)
 Gakkel I (a.k.a. YaMG)
 Gakkel II
 Gakkel III
 Gakkel IV
 Gakkel V
 Gakkel VI
 Gakkel VII Rosja
 Gakkel VIII
 Gakkel IX

Galaxie 
 Galaxie G-100
 Galaxie G-100A

Galaxy Aerospace 
(see List of aircraft (I)#IAI)

GALCA
(Groupement d'Aviation Légère de Casablanca / Messieurs Barzado, Belicha, Sairand, Domecq, Rousseau and Saunier)
 GALCA biplan à fente (biplan à fente - biplane with slot)

Gallatin 
(Harold & Oscar Gallatin, Milwaukee & Waukesha, WI)
 Gallatin 1935 Monoplane
 Gallatin A

Gallaudet 
(Gallaudet Aircraft Corporation)
 Gallaudet Hydroplane
 Gallaudet Wing-Warping Kite
 Gallaudet Hydro-Bike
 Gallaudet 1911 Monoplane
 Gallaudet 59-A
 Gallaudet A-1 Bullet
 Gallaudet A-2 Bullet
 Gallaudet B
 Gallaudet Big Boy
 Gallaudet C-1
 Gallaudet C-2 a.k.a. Military Tractor
 Gallaudet C-3 Tourist
 Gallaudet Chummy
 Gallaudet D-1
 Gallaudet D-2
 Gallaudet D-4
 Gallaudet DB-1
 Gallaudet DB-1B
 Gallaudet Flying Boat
 Gallaudet PW-4
 Gallaudet Twin Hydro
 Gallaudet CO-1
 Gallaudet CO-2
 Gallaudet CO-3
 Gallaudet P-234 (Wright Field)
 Gallaudet P-255 (Wright Field)

Galvin 
(Lincoln School of Flying, 2415 O St, Lincoln, NE)
 Galvin Sky-Lark

Galvin 
 Galvin HC (Hydravion de Chasse)

Game Composites
 Game Composites GB1 GameBird

Gammeter 
(Harry C Gammeter, Cleveland, OH)
 Gammeter 1907 Ornithopter

Gannet 
(Gannet Aircraft Inc, Sun Valley, CA)
 Gannet Super Widgeon

Ganzavia 
(Ganzavia GT)
 Ganzavia GAK-22 Dino

Garbrick 
(J Lester Garbrick, Centre Hall, PA)
 Garbrick 1941 Biplane
 Garbrick Lark

Gardan 
(Yves Gardan)
 Gardan GY-20 Minicab
 Gardan GY-201
 Gardan GY-30 Supercab
 Gardan GY-80 Horizon
 Gardan GY-90 Mowgli
 Gardan GY-100 Bagheera
 Gardan GY-110 Sher Khan
 Gardan GY-120
 Gardan-Laverlochère GL.10

Garland Aerospace
(Camden, New South Wales, Australia)
Garland Vampire

Garland-Bianchi 
 Garland-Bianchi Linnet

Garland-Lincoln 
(Garland Lincoln & Claude Flagg, Van Nuys, CA, E Los Angeles, CA, Glendale, CA)
 Garland-Lincoln N28
 Garland-Lincoln LF-1

Garner 
(Bill Garner, St. Anthony, ID)
 Garner D-260 Senior Aero Sport

Garrett 
(Don Garrett)
 Garrett Pokie Okie

Garrison 
(Peter Garrison, Los Angeles, CA)
 Garrison OM-1 Melmoth
 Garrison OM-2 Melmoth 2

Garrow Aircraft 
(Garrow Aircraft LLC)
 Verticopter

Gary 
(1909: William Pierce Gary, 75 Lincoln Ave, Totowa, NJ, 1910: Non-Capsizable Aeroplane Co, Paterson, NJ)
 Gary Hoople

Gaslov
(Vladimir Gaslov)
 Gaslov I-2 Impuls

Gasne 
(René Gasne)
 Gasne RG-3

Gastambide-Levavasseur 
(Robert Gastambide et Léon Levavasseur)
 Gastambide-Levavasseur No.1
 Gastambide-Levavasseur No.2 variable area wings

Gastambide-Mengin 
(Jules Gastambide et Gabriel Mengin)
 Gastambide-Mengin monoplane

Gasuden 
(Tokyo Gasu Denki Kogyo KK - Tokyo Gas & Electrical Industry Co. Ltd.)
 Gasuden KR-1 Small Passenger Transport
 Gasuden KR-2 Small Passenger Transport
 Gasuden Model 1 Trainer
 Gasuden Model 2 Trainer
 Gasuden Model 3 Trainer
 Gasuden Koken Long-range research aircraft
 Gasuden TR-1 Medium Passenger Transport
 Gasuden TR-2 Medium Passenger Transport

Gatard 
 Gatard Statoplan AG-01 Alouette
 Gatard Statoplan AG-02 Poussin
 Gatard Statoplan AG-03 Hirondelle
 Gatard Statoplan AG-04 Pigeon
 Gatard Statoplan AG-05 Mésange

Gates 
(B L Gates, Chicago, IL)
 Gates 1910 Aeroplane

Gates 
((Ivan R) Gates Aircraft Corp, 1440 Broadway, New York, NY)
 Gates RSV Convertiplane

Gatling 
(James Henry Gatling, Maney's Neck, NC)
 Gatling 1872 Aeroplane

Gaucher 
(Remy Gaucher)
 Gaucher TRG-662
 Gaucher RG.40 Week-End
 Gaucher RG.40T
 Gaucher RG-45 Club-45
 Gaucher GA-620 Gaucho

Gaunt (aircraft constructor) 
 Gaunt biplane no.2

Gauthier 
(David Gauthier, Seattle, WA)
 Gauthier Sport Model 1

Gavilán 
(Gavilán SA, Columbia)
 Gavilán G358

Gaviota 
(Donald W Whittier, Los Angeles, CA)
 Gaviota ST-1A

Gazda 
(Antoine Gazda, Wakefield, RI, Helicopter Engr & Construction Co.)
 Gazda Helicospeeder
 Gazda 100
 Gazda 101

Gazuit-Valladeau 
(Georges Gazuit & Roger Valladeau)
 Gazuit-Valladeau GV-1020 Gazelle
 Gazuit-Valladeau GV-1031 Gazelle
 Gazuit-Valladeau GV-1032
 Gazuit-Valladeau GV-103

Gdecouv'R
(Fontaine Lès Dijon, France)
Gdecouv'R 582

GCA
(Grupo Construzione Aeronautiche)
 GCA.1 Pedro
 GCA.2 Dumbo
 GCA.3 Etabeta
 Gripo G.G.7

GECI International
 GECI SK-105 Skylander

Gee Bee
see List_of_aircraft (Go-Gz) - Granville Brothers

Geest
(Geeste Flugzeugbau - Waldemaar Geest)
 Geest-Wolfmüller Motorflugzeug (1910)
 Geest Möwe I
 Geest Möwe II
 Geest Möwe III
 Geest Möwe IV
 Geest Möwe V
 Geest Möwe VI
 Geest 1916 single-seat fighter

Geffroy 
 Geffroy 1948 aeroplane

Geide 
(Richard F Geide, Wichita, KS)
 Geide Headwind
 Geide Model A Sport

Geiger 
(Robert V Geiger, Wewaka, IN)
 Geiger 1932 Monoplane

Geltz 
(Roy K Geltz, Lancaster, PA)
 Geltz Bluebird
 Geltz Deluxe

Gem
(Gem Aircraft)
 Gem Sky Gem

Gemini 
(Gemini International)
 Gemini Hummingbird

Gemini Powered Parachutes
(Culver, IN)
Gemini Classic
Gemini Star
Gemini Twin
Gemini Ultra Star
Gemini Viper

GEN 
(Gennai Yanagisawa / GEN Corporation)
 BDH-1 Boy's Dream Helicopter
 BDH-2
 BDH-3
 BDH-4
 GEN H-4

Genair 
 Genair Aeriel II

Genairco 
 Genairco Biplane

General
(General Aircraft Corporation, Lowell, MA)
 General Skyfarer

General 
(General Aeronautic Co, 110-112 W 40 St, New York, NY)
 General 1916 Biplane

General 
(General Aeroplane Co, 1507 Jefferson Ave, E Detroit, MI)
 General 1916 Flying Boat
 General 1916 Gamma S Seaplane
 General 1916 Gamma L Landplane

General 
(General Aircraft Corp (Conrad & John W Dietz), Cincinnati, OH)
 GAC Nighthawk

General 
(Hazleton General Aircraft Corp (Pres: George B Markle), Hazleton, PA; (built at Berwyck, PA))
 General Navigator
 General Pilot

General 
(General Airplanes Corp, 553 Abbott Rd, Buffalo, NY (founders: Charles S Rieman, A Francis Arcier))
 General 101 Surveyor (a.k.a. Observer)
 General 102 Aristocrat
 General 107 Mailman
 General 111-C Cadet

General 
(General Airplane Services (Jack Yentzer), Sheridan, WY)
 General Model 11

General 
 General Aircraft Corporation GAC-100

General Aircraft Ltd 
 General Aircraft Monospar ST-4
 General Aircraft Monospar ST-6
 General Aircraft Monospar ST-10
 General Aircraft Monospar ST-11
 General Aircraft Monospar ST-12
 General Aircraft Monospar ST-18 Croydon
 General Aircraft Monospar ST-25
 General Aircraft GAL.26
 General Aircraft GAL.33 Cagnet
 General Aircraft GAL.38 Fleet Shadower
 General Aircraft GAL.41
 General Aircraft GAL.42 Cygnet II
 General Aircraft GAL.45 Owlet
 General Aircraft GAL.47
 General Aircraft GAL.48 Hotspur
 General Aircraft G.A.L.48B Twin-Hotspur
 General Aircraft GAL.49 Hamilcar
 General Aircraft GAL.50 1/2 scale Hamilcar
 General Aircraft GAL.55
 General Aircraft GAL.56
 General Aircraft GAL.58 Hamilcar X powered Hamilcar (2x Bristol Mercury)
 General Aircraft GAL.60 Universal Freighter
 General Aircraft GAL.61

General Atomics 
 General Atomics GNAT 750
 General Atomics RQ-1 Predator

General Avia 
General Avia Picchio
General Avia Delfino
General Avia Pegaso
General Avia Jet Condor
General Avia Pinguino
General Avia Airtruck
General Avia Canguro
General Avia Sparviero

General Aviation 
(General Aviation Manufacturing Corporation, Baltimore, MD)
 General Aviation AF-15
 General Aviation PJ
 General Aviation GA-43
 General Aviation XFA

General Aviation Design Bureau of Ukraine
(Kiev, Ukraine)
General Aviation Design Bureau T-2 Maverick
General Aviation Design Bureau T-32 Maverick

General Dynamics 
 McDonnell Douglas/General Dynamics A-12 Avenger
 General Dynamics F-16 Fighting Falcon
 F-16 VISTA
 General Dynamics F-111 Aardvark
 General Dynamics Model 100
 General Dynamics A-8

General Motors 
(Eastern Div, General Motors Corp.)
 General Motors FM Wildcat
 General Motors FM-2 Wildcat
 General Motors F3M Bearcat
 General Motors TBM Avenger
 Fisher P-75A Eagle

General-Western 
(General-Western Aero Corp Ltd (founders: Albin Peterson & L F Vremsak), Burbank, CA)
 General-Western Bantam
 General-Western Phantom
 General-Western B-6
 General-Western P-1 Meteor
 General-Western P-2 Meteor
 General-Western T-6 Air Coach

Georgias Special 
(Vern Georgia & Herb Hecker, Bloomington, MN)
 Georgias Special

Gephart 
(Harry L Gephart, Silver City, NM)
 Gephart 1930 Monoplane

Geraci 
(Al Geraci, Roselle, IL)
 Geraci Advance Jeep-O-Plane

Gérard 
(André Gérard)
 Gérard RG-45 Club-45
 SIPA-Gérard NC.853G

Gerbrecht
 Gerbrecht W.3

Gere
(George W "Bud" Gere Jr, Minneapolis, MN)
 Gere Crusader
 Gere Sport

Gerfan 
 Gerfan RV 02

Gérin 
(Jaques Gérin, France)
 Gérin 1936 Varivol biplane
 Gérin 1938 V.6E Varivol Racer

Gerhardt 
(W F Gerhardt & E L Pratt, Dayton, OH)
 Gerhardt Autogiro
 Gerhardt Cycloplane

German Aircraft 
(German Aircraft GmbH)
 German Aircraft Sky-Maxx

German Gyro
(German Gyro Safety Aviation GmbH)
 German Gyro Matto

Germania 
(Germania Flugzeugwerke G.m.b.H.)
 Germania DB
 Germania JM
 Germania K.D.D.
 Germania B type 1915
 Germaina B.I
 Germaina C.I
 Germaina C.II
 Germaina C.IV

Gerner 
(Adlerwerke den Flugzeugbau Gerner)
 Gerner G.I 
 Gerner G.IIR

Germe 
Germe 1909 Biplane

Geselle 
(Matilda Geselle, Wichita, KS)
 Geselle 1927 Monoplane

Geuther 
(Gene Geuther, Lansdale, PA)
 Geuther Angel Kitten

Ghods Industry 
 Ghods Saeghe
 Ghods Talash
 Ghods Mohajer

GibboGear 
(Mark Gibson, Winter Haven, FL)
GibboGear Butterfly

Gidroplan 
(Gidroplan LLC)
 Gidroplan Tsikada
 Gidroplan Tsikada-M
 Gidroplan Sky Wind-1
 Gidroplan Tsikada-M3
 Gidroplan Tsikada-4
 Gidroplan Sky Wind-AT

Gidrosamolet 
(Gidrosamolet LCC / Chernov) see Chernov

GIL
(GIL - Główny Instytut Lotnictwa - Main Aviation Institute)
 GIL BŻ-4 Żuk

Gilbert 
(Charles Gilbert, Dorset, OH)
 Gilbert Toots (a.k.a. Model 30)

Giles 
See:AkroTech Aviation

 Gilkey 
(Lynn W Gilkey, New Castle, PA)
 Gilkey Sport

 Gillespie 
(G Curtis Gillespie, Brooklyn, NY)
 Gillespie 1905 Aeroplane

 Gillette 
(P E Gillette, Salt Lake City, UT)
 Gillette 1910 Aerodyne

 Gillis 
((Carl) Gillis Aircraft Co, Battle Creek, MI)
 Gillis Crusader

 Gilmore 
(Lyman Gilmore Jr, Grass Valley, CA 1909: Colfax Aeroplane Co. 1910: Gilmore Airship Co.)
 Gilmore 1898 steam-powered Aeroplane
 Gilmore 1908 Pusher-Tractor
 Gilmore 1911 Monoplane

 Gilpin 
(Charles W Gilpin, Los Angeles, CA)
 Gilpin 1925 Biplane

Gin Gliders
(Yongin, South Korea)
Gin Atlas
Gin Bandit
Gin Bobcat
Gin Bolero
Gin Bolero Plus
Gin Bongo
Gin Boomerang
Gin Carrera
Gin Falcon
Gin Fluid
Gin Fuse
Gin Gangster
Gin GTO
Gin Nano
Gin Nomad
Gin Oasis
Gin Pegasus
Gin Rage
Gin Safari
Gin Sprint
Gin Vantage
Gin Yak
Gin Yeti

Ginnochio
(Manlio Ginnochio)
 Ginnochio 1912 flying boat (Argus 100hp)

 Gippsland 
 Gippsland GA8 Airvan
 Gippsland GA10
 Gippsland GA200 Fatman

 Giraud 
(Wilfrid Giraud)
 Giraud Elytroplan

 Giraud-Sablier 
(Wilfrid Giraud & Sablier)
 Giraud-Sablier T.4

 Giraudet 
(Giraudet)
 Giraudet DG.01 Loriot

 Giravia 
 Giravia LP.10

 Gittens 
(David L Gittens, Santa Fe, NM)
 Gittens Ikenga

 Givaudan 
 Givaudan 1909 Annular biplane

 Glanard 
(Raymond Glanard)
 Glanard Monoplan

 Glasair 
(Glasair Acquisitions LLC (Pres: Thomas Wathen), Riverside, CA)
 Glasair I
 Glasair II
 Glasair III
 Glasair Glastar
 Glasair Turbine 250
 Glasair SH
 Arocet AT-9 Stalker
 Glasair Merlin LSA
 Glasair Sportsman

 Glaser-Dirks See also DG Flugzeugbau GmbH
 Gläser-Dirks DG-100
 Gläser-Dirks DG-101
 Gläser-Dirks DG-200
 Gläser-Dirks DG-200/17
 Gläser-Dirks DG-202
 Gläser-Dirks DG-300
 Gläser-Dirks DG-303
 Gläser-Dirks DG-400
 Gläser-Dirks DG-500
 Gläser-Dirks DG-500/18
 Gläser-Dirks DG-500/22
 Gläser-Dirks DG-505
 Gläser-Dirks DG-600
 Gläser-Dirks DG-600/18

Glasflügel 
 Björn Stender BS-1
 Glasflügel H-30 GFK
 Glasflügel H-201 Standard-Libelle
 Glasflügel 202 Standard-Libelle
 Glasflügel 203 Standard-Libelle
 Glasflügel 204 Standard-Libelle
 Glasflügel 205 Club-Libelle
 Glasflügel 206 Hornet
 Glasflügel 206 Hornet C
 Glasflügel H-301 Libelle
 Glasflügel 303 Mosquito
 Glasflügel 304
 Glasflügel 401 Kestrel (129)
 Glasflügel 402
 Glasflügel 604 Kestrel 22
 Glasflügel 701
 Glasflügel 704

Glassic Composites
(Glassic Composites, LLC, Sale Creek, TN)
Glassic SQ2000

Glatfelter 
(Edward W Glatfelter, Newton Square, PA)
 Glatfelter G-100 Glaticopter
 Glatfelter XRG-65

Gleek 
(Albert Gleek Jr, 73 Garfield Ave, Paterson, NJ)
 Gleek 1933 Biplane

Glen-Lee 
(G M Glendenning & A L Kennedy, Ontario, Canada)
 Glen-Lee Special

Glenmont 
(H P "Glen" Warren & John G Montijo, San Luis Obispo, CA)
 Glenmont 1927 Monoplane

Glenn 
(Timothy A Glenn, Detroit, MI)
 Glenn 1929 Monoplane
 Glenn 1931 Monoplane
 Glenn 1935 Monoplane

Glenview 
(Glenview Metal Products Co, Delanco, NJ)
 Glenview GMP-1 Fly-Ride

Glidaire 
(Glidaire Co, 119 E Martin St, San Antonio, TX)
 Glidaire 1931 powered sailplane

Glideoplane 
(Glideoplane & Engine Co Inc, 1220 N Western Ave, Oklahoma City, OK)
 Glideoplane 1931 powered sailplane

Global 
(Global Aircraft Corporation)
 Global GT-3

Globe 
 Globe GC-1 Swift
 Globe BTC-1
 Globe KDG Snipe
 Globe KD2G Firefly
 Globe KD3G Snipe
 Globe KD4G Quail
 Globe KD5G

Gloster 
(Gloster Aircraft Company) 
 Gloster II
 Gloster III
 Gloster IV
 Gloster VI
 Gloster AS.31 Survey
 Gloster E.1/44, also known as Gloster Ace
 Gloster E.28/39
 Gloster F.5/34
 Gloster F.9/37
 Gloster Gambet
 Gloster Gannet
 Gloster Gamecock
 Gloster Gauntlet
 Gloster Gladiator
 Gloster Gnatsnapper
 Gloster Goldfinch
 Gloster Goral
 Gloster Gorcock
 Gloster Goring
 Gloster Grebe
 Gloster Grouse
 Gloster Guan
 Gloster Javelin
 Gloster Mars
 Gloster Meteor
 Gloster Meteor F8 "Prone Pilot"
 Gloster Nightjar
 Gloster Sea Gladiator
 Gloster Sparrowhawk
 Gloster TC.33
 Gloster TSR.38

Glowin'ski 
 Głowiński monoplane

Gluhareff 
(E (Eugene) Gluhareff Helicopter Corp, Palm Springs, FL)
 Gluhareff MEG-1X
 Gluhareff MEG-2X
 Gluhareff MEG-3X

Gmoser 
(A T Gmoser Jr, Milwaukee, WI)
 Gmoser Trainer

__

References

Further reading

 List of aircraft (G-Gn)

fr:Liste des aéronefs (E-H)